Martin Owen Gallagher  (born 11 February 1952) is a New Zealand politician and was Labour member of Parliament representing the Hamilton West electorate until November 2008. Currently, he is councillor on the Hamilton City Council West Ward as well as Deputy Mayor of Hamilton.

Early life
Gallagher was educated at Hamilton Boys' High School, and the University of Waikato where he completed a Bachelor of Social Science degree. He is a qualified teacher.

Political career

Member of Parliament
 

He was first elected to Parliament in the 1993 election, when he won the Hamilton West electorate. In the 1996 election, however, he was defeated by National's Bob Simcock. In the 1999 election, he won back the electorate. At the 2005 election, he had a slender majority of 825 votes, 2.0% more than his opponent. In the 2008 general election he was defeated by National's Tim Macindoe. His list placing of 41 meant that he was not returned to Parliament. The swing in Hamilton West at the 2008 election against Gallagher was less than half the nationwide swing against his Government.

Gallagher was Chairperson of the Foreign Affairs, Defence and Trade Select Committee and formerly the Law and Order Select Committee.

Local body politics
Before standing for Parliament, Gallagher was a councillor for the Hamilton City Council from 1985–1994, and served as Deputy Mayor of Hamilton from 1988 to 1993, and again from 2016 to 2019.

After losing his Parliamentary seat in 2008, Gallagher returned to local body politics. In the 2010 and 2013 local elections, he ran for the Hamilton City Council and the Waikato District Health Board as an independent candidate. He was returned for both positions in each election.

Personal life
Gallagher has four children and is a cousin of Sir William Gallagher, of the well known Waikato family who run Gallagher Group, an international farming and security company.

Gallagher is a Justice of the Peace. He returned to teaching after being ousted in the 2008 election.

References

External links
 
 Page on Parliamentary website

1952 births
Living people
Deputy mayors of places in New Zealand
Hamilton City Councillors
New Zealand Labour Party MPs
People from Hamilton, New Zealand
University of Waikato alumni
Unsuccessful candidates in the 1996 New Zealand general election
Unsuccessful candidates in the 2008 New Zealand general election
New Zealand MPs for North Island electorates
Members of the New Zealand House of Representatives
21st-century New Zealand politicians